US Baie-Mahault is a football club in Guadeloupe, based in the town of Baie-Mahault.

They play in Guadeloupe's second division, the Promotion d'Honneur Régionale.

Achievements
Coupe de Guadeloupe: 1
 1988

External links
 Official website – US Baie-Mahault
 Tour des clubs 2008–2009 – Gwadafoot 
 Club info – French Football Federation 

Baie